The 1980 United States presidential election in South Carolina took place on November 4, 1980. All 50 states and The District of Columbia were part of the 1980 United States presidential election. South Carolina voters chose 8 electors to the Electoral College, who voted for president and vice president.

South Carolina was won by former California Governor Ronald Reagan (R) by a very slim margin of 1 point and a half.

The state weighed in for this election as 8% more Democratic than the national average, just 3% less than four years earlier. , this is the last election in which the following counties voted for a Democratic presidential candidate: York, Anderson, Oconee, Cherokee, Greenwood, Laurens, and Saluda.

Results

Results by county

References

South Carolina
1980
1980 South Carolina elections